Bagdogra is a settlement in the Naxalbari CD block in the Siliguri subdivision of the Darjeeling district, in the Indian state of West Bengal. It is a part of the Greater Siliguri Metropolitan Area. The Bagdogra is well connected by air to six major cities of India – Delhi, Mumbai, Bengaluru, Hyderabad, Kolkata and Chennai  through the Bagdogra Airport. The Bagdogra railway station is also well connected.

Geography

Location
It is 11km away from Siliguri. 
It has two National Highways:- AH 2  and NH 31C. It also has Asian Highway (AH2).

Area overview
The map alongside shows the Siliguri subdivision of Darjeeling district. This area is spread across the foothills of the Himalayas and is a plain land gently sloping from north to south. While the northern part is mentioned as the Terai region, the larger southern portion forms the western part of the Dooars region. While 55.11% per cent of the population resides in the rural areas, 44.89% resides in the urban areas. On the western side the Mechi River forms a long border with Nepal. On the eastern side the Mahananda River forms a short border with Bangladesh. 
Note: The map alongside presents some of the notable locations in the subdivision. All places marked in the map are linked in the larger full screen map.

Climate

Civic administration

Police station
Bagdogra police station has jurisdiction over parts of Siliguri Municipal Corporation.

Transport

Airway

The one airport, Bagdogra International Airport, (IATA: IXB, ICAO: VEBD) is located in about 16 km (9.9 mi) west of the city of Siliguri in the Darjeeling district in northern West Bengal, India. It is operated as a civil enclave at Air Force Station Bagdogra. It is the gateway airport to the hill station towns of Darjeeling, Kurseong, Mirik, and Kalimpong and the state of Sikkim, and sees thousands of tourists annually. Permits for Foreign tourists intending to journey to Sikkim are issued at this airport. And airport is a major stop in the region with flights connecting Kolkata, New Delhi, Mumbai, Bangalore, Chennai, Hyderabad, Guwahati, Paro and Bangkok. The airport also has regular helicopter flights to Gangtok, the capital of Sikkim. The central government of India conferred international airport status to the airport in 2002 with limited international operations.

Railway

Bagdogra Railway Station comes under Northeast Frontier Railway zone (NFR) Siliguri-Katihar Railway Line. The station code of Bagdogra is (BORA).

Roadway
It has two National Highways :- NH 31 and NH 31C. It also has Asian Highway (AH2) which is connected with Nepal and Bangladesh. It provides a gateway to North - East India.

Education
The University of North Bengal was established at Raja Rammohunpur in 1962.

Kalipada Ghosh Tarai Mahavidyalaya was established at Bagdogra in 1988. Affiliated with the University of North Bengal, it offers honours courses in Bengali, Nepali, Hindi, English, geography, history, political science, sociology, accountancy, management, and general courses in arts, science and commerce.

References

Neighbourhoods in Siliguri
Siliguri
Cities and towns in Darjeeling district